The Henrico Citizen is a daily weekday community news organization in Henrico County, a suburb of Richmond, Virginia. The Citizen was created in 2001 by editor Tom Lappas and has earned 213 awards for news content and advertising design since 2002.

Along with staff member Tara Gray, Lappas has launched three podcasts under the Henrico Citizen brand.

The Citizen ceased publishing a printed edition in March 2020 due to the economic impact of the COVID-19 pandemic and simultaneously expanded to a daily weekday publication online, through email and through social media and an app.

References

External links 
Official site

Newspapers published in Virginia
Publications established in 2001